Busa or BUSA may refer to:

 Busa language (Mande), Africa
 Busa language (Papuan), New Guinea
 British Underwater Sports Association
  British Universities Sports Association, a former British organisation succeeded in 2008 by the British Universities and Colleges Sport
 Buša cattle, Bos brachyeros europeus
 Busa (surname), a surname (including a list of people with the name)

See also
 Suzuki Hayabusa, motorcycle
 
 
 Bus (disambiguation)